The BMW R1150GS and R1150GS Adventure are motorcycles that were manufactured by BMW Motorrad from 1999 through 2004. There was a limited run of 2005-06 model year R1150GSA models as well. The R1150GS models are part of the BMW GS family of dual-sport or adventure motorcycles that have been produced from 1981 to the present date. The bikes have a 1,130 cc horizontally opposed flat-twin engine and shaft drive.

Production history
The 1,130 cc R1150GS had a new six-speed gearbox. It replaced the R1100GS, which had a 1,085 cc engine and a five speed gearbox.

The standard R1150GS model was produced from 1999 to 2004, when it was replaced by the more powerful and lighter R1200GS. The  R1150GS Adventure, which was produced from 2001 to 2005, was replaced by the R1200GS Adventure in 2006.

In late 2002, the optional ABS system was replaced with an electrically servo-assisted combined braking system. In addition the engines were equipped with twin spark plugs on each cylinder; this was intended to improve emissions and improve a persistent surging problem that affected many BMW boxer models.

A total of 58,023 standard R1150GS models and 17,828 Adventure models were made.

Model differences
The R1150GS Adventure had a number of differences over the standard bike to make it more suitable for overland and adventure travel. These included an optional  fuel tank, larger screen, single-piece seat,  taller suspension front and rear, lower first gear and a conventional sixth gear in place of the standard model's overdrive gear. An anti-knock sensor adjustment change allowed the adventure version to run on lower quality gasoline as well. Common options on both models were heated handgrips and ABS brakes.

Awards and long-distance riding

In 2000, Cycle World Magazine awarded the R1150GS "Best Sport Touring Bike".
In 2005, the R1150GS Adventure was awarded "Best Traillie" by British publication RiDE Magazine, and the standard model came third.
The R1150GS Adventure was ridden in 2004 by Ewan McGregor and Charley Boorman in their  ride from London to New York City, depicted in the book and TV series Long Way Round. The R1150GS's successor, the R1200GS Adventure was used in the follow-up Long Way Down trip. It was also ridden by Guinness World Record motorcycle endurance holder Simon Newbound.
Kevin Sanders and his wife Julia rode the R1150GS for their Guinness World Record for the fastest world circumnavigation by motorcycle in 2002. They also rode the R1150GS Adventure for their record-breaking traversal of the Pan-American Highway in 2003.

References

External links

R1150GS specifications & history
R1150GS Adventure specifications & history
R1150GS specifications
, official promo showing the motorcycle in Bolivia

R1150GS
Motorcycles powered by flat engines
Shaft drive motorcycles
Dual-sport motorcycles
Motorcycles introduced in 1999